Reginald Eugene Sutton (born February 15, 1965) is a former American football cornerback in the National Football League and Arena Football League. He was drafted by the New Orleans Saints in the fifth round of the 1986 NFL Draft. He played college football at Miami.

References

1965 births
Living people
Miami Killian Senior High School alumni
Players of American football from Miami
American football cornerbacks
Miami Hurricanes football players
New Orleans Saints players
Miami Hooters players
Las Vegas Sting players
Iowa Barnstormers players
National Football League replacement players